Night Spot is a 1938 American comedy film directed by Christy Cabanne and written by Lionel Houser. The film stars Harry Parke, Allan Lane, Gordon Jones, Joan Woodbury, and Lee Patrick. The film was released on February 25, 1938, by RKO Pictures.

Plot
Marge Dexter is bored with her career and wants to sing, so she goes to an interview at the Royal Beach Club owned by gangster Marty Davis, she gets the job, but there are two policemen working undercover as band members.

Cast
 Harry Parke as Gashouse (credited as Parkyakarkus)
 Allan Lane as Pete Cooper
 Gordon Jones as Riley
 Joan Woodbury as Marge Dexter 
 Lee Patrick as Flo Bradley
 Bradley Page as Marty Davis
 Jack Carson as Shallen
 Frank M. Thomas as Headwaiter
 Joseph Crehan as Inspector Wayland
 Crawford Weaver as Smokey
 Cecil Kellaway as Willard Lorryweather
 Rollo Lloyd as Vail

References

External links
 
 
 
 

1938 films
American black-and-white films
RKO Pictures films
Films directed by Christy Cabanne
American comedy films
1938 comedy films
1930s English-language films
1930s American films